Stenelaphus alienus is a species of beetle in the family Cerambycidae, the only species in the genus Stenelaphus.

References

Elaphidiini